

Group A

Burkina Faso
Coach: Issa Balboné

Congo
Coach:  Claude Le Roy

The final squad was announced on 31 August 2015.

Sudan
Coach: Hamdan Hemed

Zimbabwe
Coach: Nation Dube

The final squad was announced on 2 September 2015.

Group B

Ghana
Coach: Malik Jabir

The final squad was announced on 28 August 2015.

Nigeria
Coach: Samson Siasia

The 31-man provisional squad was announced on 13 August 2015.

Senegal
Coach: Serigne Saliou Dia

References

African Games football squads
Men's team squads